Ezzatolah Entezami (21 June 1924 – 17 August 2018) was an Iranian actor. Entezami, Ali Nasirian, Mohammad Ali Keshavarz, Jamshid Mashayekhi and Davoud Rashidi are known as "the five most important actors in the history of Iranian cinema" because of their influence.

Career
Ezzatolah Entezami started his career on stage in 1941 and graduated from theatre and cinema school in Hanover, Germany in 1958. He has been acting in movies since 1969. His debut performance in Darius Mehrjui’s film, The Cow, received the Silver Hugo in Chicago International Film Festival in 1971. He shined in the role of a naive villager who cannot endure the death of his beloved cow and starts to believe that he is the cow himself.

Entezami was known as one of the most prominent actors in Iranian cinema and has been labeled as the greatest actor in the history of the cinema of Iran. He worked with most of the prominent Iranian film directors, including Darius Mehrjui (eight films), Ali Hatami (four films), Nasser Taqvaee, Mohsen Makhmalbaf, Behrouz Afkhami and Rakhshan Bani-Etemad. He was awarded the Crystal Simorgh for the Best Actor twice from the International Fajr Film Festival, for Grand Cinema and The Day of Angel. 
His work and accomplishments were recognized in October 2006 at the Iran cultural center in Paris.

Personal life
His son, Majid Entezami is an Iranian film score composer.

Selected filmography 

 Vareite bahari (1949)
 The Cow (1969) - Masht Hassan
 Mr. Naive (1970) - Mohammadipoor / Fathollah Khan
 The Postman (1972) - Niyatollah
 Bita (1972) - Bita's father
 Sattar Khan (1972) - Heydar Khan Amoo-Ughli
 Sadegh the Kurdish (1972) - Sergeant Vali Khan
 Love’s Tumult (1973) - Kamal
 Kingdom of Heaven (1975)
 Sleeping Lion (1976)
 The Cycle (1976)
 The Dust Dwellers (1977) - Dr. Sameri
 In Grouhe Mahkoomin (1977) - Hossein General
 Condemned (1978)
 The School We Went To (1980)
 Hadji Washington (1982)
 Hajji Washington (1983) - Hajji Hossein-Gholi Noori
 The Spider’s House (1983)
 Kamalolmolk (1984) - Nasereddin Shah
 The Suitcase (1985, released in 1988)
 Jafar Khan Returns from Europe (1985)
 Stony Lion (1986)
 In the Wind’s Eye (1986)
 The Tenants (1987) - Abbas
 Shirak (1988) - Haj Khaloo
 Hezar Dastan (1988, TV Mini-Series) - Hezardastan
 The Ship Angelica (1989)
 Grand Cinema (1989) - Aghaiev
 Eye of the Hurricane (1989) - Amir Houshang
 Hamoun (1990) - Dabiri
 The Shadow of Imagination (1990)
 Saye khial (1991)
 Banu (1991, released in 1998)
 The Quiet Home (1991)
 Once Upon a Time, Cinema (1992) - Nassereddin Shah / Mozzaffaeddin Shah / Mash Hasan
 Baanoo (1992) - Ghorban Salar
 The Toy (1992, released in 1994) - Ghadir zafarlu
 The Battle of Oil Tankers (1993)
 Day of the Angel (1993, also-sc.) - Amir Jalaleddin
 Rooz-e fereshte (1994) - Niyyatollah
 Jang-e naftkesh-ha (1994)
 The Blue Veiled (1995)
 The Fateful Day (1995) - Rasul Rahmani
 Typhoon (1997)
 The Punishment Committee (1997) - Khan-e Mozaffar
 Wind and Anemone (1997)
 Takhti, the World Champion (1998, the first version, unfinished) - Takhti's father
 Tehran Rozegar-e No (1999) - Khan-e Mozaffar
 The Mix (2000) - (guest star)
 The Dark Room
 Twilight (2001) - Detective Alavi
 A House Built on Water (2002) - Dr. Sepidbakht's father
 Divanei az ghafas parid (2003) - Mostofi
 Jayi baraye zendegi (2003) - Eydi Mohammad
 A Place to Live (2003)
 Gav khuni (2003)
 Order (2004)
 Stars (2005)
 The Command (2005) - Reza Ma'roofi
 Setareh Mishavad (2006) - Rafi Golkar
 Colors of Memory (2007) - Ghanati
 Shab (2008) - Dr. Parviz
 Atash-e sabz (2008) - Judge
 Zadboom (2009) - Colonel Amiri
 Forty Years Old (2010) - Judge
 The Maritime Silk Road (2011) - Slave Merchant (final film role)
 Gohar Kheirandish a Filmography (2015) - Himself

References

External links
 
 An interview with Ezzatollah Entezami in connection with the recently produced biopic "... and the Blue Sky", directed by Ghazaleh Soltani and produced by Ghasem Gholipour, Mehr News Agency, 21 November 2010,   (in Persian). Photo reportage of the interview:  .

1924 births
2018 deaths
People from Tehran
Male actors from Tehran
Iranian male film actors
Iranian male stage actors
Iranian male television actors
Crystal Simorgh for Best Actor winners
Recipients of the Order of Culture and Art
Burials at artist's block of Behesht-e Zahra
Crystal Simorgh for Best Supporting Actor winners
Iranian Science and Culture Hall of Fame recipients in Cinema